Glory By Honor XV was a two night, two city professional wrestling event produced by the U.S.-based wrestling promotion Ring of Honor, and the 15th Glory By Honor. The first night of the event took place on October 14, 2016 at the Frontier Fieldhouse in Chicago Ridge, Illinois.  The second part of the event took place on October 15, 2016 at Ford Community & Performing Arts Center in Dearborn, Michigan.

Storylines 
Glory By Honor XV featured professional wrestling matches involving wrestlers engaged in scripted feuds or storylines that play out on ROH's television program, Ring of Honor Wrestling. Wrestlers portrayed heroes (faces) or villains (heels) as they followed a series of events that built tension and culminated in a wrestling match or series of matches.

Results

Night 1 - Chicago Ridge, IL

Night 2 - Dearborn, MI

See also
 2016 in professional wrestling

References

2016 in professional wrestling
Professional wrestling in the Chicago metropolitan area
2016 in Illinois
2016 in Michigan
Events in Chicago
Events in Wayne County, Michigan
15
Professional wrestling in Dearborn, Michigan
October 2016 events in the United States